Live: Wherever You Are is an album, released in 2006, by country music artist Jack Ingram. His first album for Big Machine Records, it is largely a live album, although it features two studio tracks respectively entitled "Wherever You Are" and "Love You", both of which were released as singles. The former became Ingram's breakthrough hit, having reached number one on the Billboard Hot Country Songs charts in 2006.

Content
Although mostly composed of live tracks, the album contains two original studio recordings. These are "Wherever You Are" and "Love You". Much of the content was recorded at Gruene Hall in Texas and was originally released independently in 2004 as Happy Happy. Upon re-release for Big Machine Records, the album had some tracks removed and the two studio cuts added. Also added was "Never Knocked Me Down", which Ingram and then-labelmate Danielle Peck originally recorded for the concert series CMT Outlaws (on CMT) in 2005. Live: Wherever You Are was the first release for Big Machine.

Both "Wherever You Are" and "Love You" were issued as singles, charting on Billboard Hot Country Songs in 2006. The former was the first number-one single for the Big Machine label.

Critical reception
Brian Wahlert of Country Standard Time reviewed the album favorably, writing that "Ingram distinguishes himself with fantastic songs and a stage energy that's palpable on this live recording." Thom Jurek of AllMusic was less favorable, criticizing the album's flow due to the presence of the CMT Outlaws recording and studio recordings.

Track listing

Personnel

Live Tracks
 Bukka Allen — Hammond organ, piano
 Pete Coatney — drums
 Shannon Forrest — drums on "Never Knocked Me Down"
 Paul Franklin — steel guitar on "Never Knocked Me Down"
 Jack Ingram — lead vocals, acoustic guitar, electric guitar
 Robert Kearns — bass guitar, background vocals 
 Brent Mason — electric guitar on "Never Knocked Me Down"
 Danielle Peck — duet vocals on "Never Knocked Me Down"
 Jens Pinkernell — electric guitar, background vocals 
 Michael Rhodes — bass guitar on "Never Knocked Me Down"
 Matt Rollings — keyboards on "Never Knocked Me Down"
 Biff Watson — acoustic guitar on "Never Knocked Me Down"

Studio Tracks
 Larry Franklin — mandolin on "Wherever You Are"
 Tommy Harden — drums on "Love You"
 Jack Ingram — lead vocals
 Mike Johnson — steel guitar on "Wherever You Are"
 Doug Kahan — bass guitar
 Troy Lancaster — electric guitar, sitar on "Wherever You Are"
 Paul Leim — drums on "Wherever You Are"
 Mike Rojas — piano, Hammond organ on "Love You"
 Steve Sheehan — acoustic guitar
 Joe Spivey — fiddle on "Love You"
 Russell Terrell — background vocals

Chart performance

References

Jack Ingram albums
2006 live albums
Big Machine Records live albums
Albums produced by Jeremy Stover